BestCrypt, developed by Jetico, is a commercial disk encryption app available for Windows, Linux, macOS and Android. 

BestCrypt comes in two editions: BestCrypt Volume Encryption to encrypt entire disk volumes; BestCrypt Container Encryption to encrypt virtual disks stored as computer files. 

BestCrypt also provides the complimentary data erasure utility BCWipe.

Cryptographic Algorithms
BestCrypt supports a wide variety of block cipher algorithms including AES, Serpent, Blowfish, Twofish,  DES, Triple DES, GOST 28147-89. All ciphers support CBC and LRW modes of operation while AES, Twofish and Serpent also support XTS mode.

Features
 Create and mount a virtual drive encrypted using AES, Blowfish, Twofish, CAST-128 and various other encryption methods. BestCrypt v.8 and higher can alternatively mount a subfolder on a NTFS disk instead of a drive. Encrypted virtual disk images are compatible across Windows, Linux and Mac OS X.
 Encrypt a set of files into a single, self-extracting archive. 
 Transparently encrypt entire partitions or volumes together with pre-boot authentication for encrypted boot partitions.
 Two-factor authentication.
 Support for size-efficient Dynamic Containers with the Smart Free Space Monitoring technology.
 Hardware accelerated encryption.
 Anti-keylogging facilities to protect container and volume passwords.
 Data erasure utility BCWipe to erase unprotected copies of data to complement encryption.
 Secret sharing and Public Key authentication methods in addition to basic password-based authentication.

See also
 Comparison of disk encryption software

References

Further reading

External links
 

Disk encryption
Cryptographic software